The 1988 NCAA Division II football season, part of college football in the United States organized by the National Collegiate Athletic Association at the Division II level, began in August 1988, and concluded with the NCAA Division II Football Championship on December 10, 1988, at Braly Municipal Stadium in Florence, Alabama, hosted by the University of North Alabama. The North Dakota State Bison defeated the Portland State Vikings, 35–21, to win their fourth Division II national title. The tournament bracket also expanded for the first time, from 8 teams to 16 teams.

The Harlon Hill Trophy was awarded to  Johnny Bailey, running back from Texas A&I, for the second consecutive year.

Conference changes and new programs

Conference standings

Conference summaries

Postseason

The 1988 NCAA Division II Football Championship playoffs were the 16th single-elimination tournament to determine the national champion of men's NCAA Division II college football. The championship game was held at Braly Municipal Stadium in Florence, Alabama, for the third time.

Playoff bracket

See also
1988 NCAA Division I-A football season
1988 NCAA Division I-AA football season
1988 NCAA Division III football season
1988 NAIA Division I football season
1988 NAIA Division II football season

References